John Pritchard (1797 – 19 August 1891) was an English lawyer, banker and Conservative Party politician from Broseley (and later Stanmore), near Bridgnorth in Shropshire.

After the death of his father in 1837, he gave up the law and with his brother George (died 1861) he worked at Vickers, Son & Pritchard, the bank in which his father had been partner. The bank's offices were in Broseley and in the nearby town of Bridgnorth, and it was taken over in 1888 by Lloyds Bank.  Pritchard was a close friend of the architect John Ruskin, who visited Pritchard at Broseley Hall, one of several properties inherited from his brother.  Pritchard later moved to Stanmore Grove, another property inherited from his brother.

He died in 1891, aged 94, having been a county magistrate and borough J.P. His estates were left to his wife Jane for her lifetime, and thereafter to William Pritchard Gordon, a partner in the bank.

Political career 
Pritchard was elected as the Member of Parliament (MP) for the borough of Bridgnorth in Shropshire at an unopposed by-election on 23 March 1853, after the 1852 general election result in that seat had been overturned on petition.

He held the seat for the next 15 years, until he stood down at 1868 general election, having faced only one contested election, in 1865.

References

External links 

1797 births
1891 deaths
Conservative Party (UK) MPs for English constituencies
UK MPs 1852–1857
UK MPs 1857–1859
UK MPs 1859–1865
People from Broseley
English bankers
19th-century English businesspeople